Twister may refer to:

Weather
 Tornado

Aviation
 Pipistrel Twister, a Slovenian ultralight trike
 Silence Twister, a German homebuilt aircraft design
 Wings of Change Twister, an Austrian paraglider design

Entertainment
 Twister (1989 film), a comedy film starring Suzy Amis and Crispin Glover
 Twister (1996 film), a disaster film starring Helen Hunt and Bill Paxton
 Twister...Ride it Out, a ride in Universal Studios Florida based on the film
 Twister (comics), a comic book superhero character
 Twister (game), a Milton Bradley game
 Twister (Knoebels Amusement Resort), a roller coaster at Knoebels amusement park in Elysburg, Pennsylvania
 Twister, a CITV gameshow hosted by Nigel Mitchell
 "Twister" (The Suite Life on Deck 90 Minute Special)
 "Twister", a song on the 1988 "Weird Al" Yankovic album Even Worse
 "Twister", a song on the 2001 Mariah Carey soundtrack Glitter
 Twista (born 1973), American rapper
 Twister (album), a 1988 album by Unrest
 Twister, an album by Watershed
 Twister, an album by Leisure (band)
 Twister (play), a 1999 play by Ken Kesey
 Twister (video game)

Other uses
 Twister (fish), common name for the Bellapiscis medius species of fish
 Twister (dragonfly), common name for the Tholymis tillarga species of dragonfly
 Twister (ice cream), an ice cream made by Unilever's Heartbrand
 Twister (pastry), a cruller
 Twister (software), a decentralized P2P microblogging platform
 Twister (yacht), a sailing keelboat
 Twister supersonic separator, hydrocarbon processing system for the dehydration and dewpointing of natural gas
 Twister, a type of spinal lock
 Twister (band), a Brazilian pop rock band

See also 
 Mersenne Twister, a pseudo-random number generator
 Troubletwisters series, a 2011 young adult fantasy series by Garth Nix and Sean Williams
 Ronja Twister, an electronics module for free space optic
 Twist (disambiguation)
 Twistor theory